Jason Kariya Young (born September 28, 1979) is a former professional baseball player. A right-handed pitcher, he played two seasons in Major League Baseball for the Colorado Rockies.

Young attended Stanford University. In 1998, he played collegiate summer baseball in the Cape Cod Baseball League for the Yarmouth-Dennis Red Sox.

Drafted by the Colorado Rockies in the 2nd round of the 2000 MLB amateur draft, Young made his Major League Baseball debut with the Rockies on May 12, 2003.

He retired in summer 2011 at the age of 31,, although he had not played professionally since 2005.

References

External links

Major League Baseball pitchers
Colorado Rockies players
Salem Avalanche players
Carolina Mudcats players
Colorado Springs Sky Sox players
Buffalo Bisons (minor league) players
Yarmouth–Dennis Red Sox players
Baseball players from California
1979 births
Living people
Stanford Cardinal baseball players